"Back to Life" is a song by American singer Hailee Steinfeld, released as a single from the soundtrack of the film Bumblebee on November 2, 2018.

Composition
The song has been called an "electro-kissed anthem" with "shimmering production" and "loved-up lyrics", with Steinfeld singing "Our love's enough, transcending us through space and time. It's holding up. It keeps you and me intertwined." The chorus, which contains the line "'Cause I'm bringing you back to life", was called "earnest".

Promotion
Steinfeld talked about the song in a social media post from October 2018, saying that it would be the first time she has her own song in a film she stars in. It was pointed out by Idolator's Mike Nied that this evidently does not count the songs she recorded for Pitch Perfect 2 and 3. Steinfeld hosted and performed the song for the first time at the 2018 MTV Europe Music Awards, two days after the song's release.

Critical reception
Nicole Engelman of Billboard said the track "pushes Steinfeld's soaring vocals to the forefront, layering them over an irresistible synth-heavy beat with all of the potentials of a dance-floor hit". Engelman also felt that the chorus has a "Chainsmokers-esque beat drop and infectious hook".

Charts

References

2018 singles
2018 songs
Hailee Steinfeld songs
Songs written by Hailee Steinfeld
Songs written by Kennedi Lykken
Songs written by Michael Pollack (musician)
Songs from Transformers (film series)